In mathematics, in the study of iterated functions and dynamical systems, a periodic point of a function is a point which the system returns to after a certain number of function iterations or a certain amount of time.

Iterated functions 
Given a mapping f from a set X into itself,

a point x in X is called periodic point if there exists an n so that

where  is the nth iterate of f. The smallest positive integer n satisfying the above is called the prime period or least period of the point x. If every point in X is a periodic point with the same period n, then f is called periodic with period n (this is not to be confused with the notion of a periodic function).

If there exist distinct n and m such that

then x is called a preperiodic point. All periodic points are preperiodic.

If f is a diffeomorphism of a differentiable manifold, so that the derivative  is defined, then one says that a periodic point is hyperbolic if

that it is attractive if

and it is repelling if

If the dimension of the stable manifold of a periodic point or fixed point is zero, the point is called a source; if the dimension of its unstable manifold is zero, it is called a sink; and if both the stable and unstable manifold have nonzero dimension, it is called a saddle or saddle point.

Examples 
A period-one point is called a fixed point.

The logistic map 

exhibits periodicity for various values of the parameter r. For r between 0 and 1, 0 is the sole periodic point, with period 1 (giving the sequence 0, 0, 0, ..., which attracts all orbits). For r between 1 and 3, the value 0 is still periodic but is not attracting, while the value  is an attracting periodic point of period 1. As the value of parameter r rises toward 4, there arise groups of periodic points with any positive integer for the period; for some values of r one of these repeating sequences is attracting while for others none of them are (with almost all orbits being chaotic).

Dynamical system 
Given a real global dynamical system (R, X, Φ) with X the phase space and Φ the evolution function,

a point x in X is called periodic with period T if

The smallest positive T with this property is called prime period of the point x.

Properties 
 Given a periodic point x with period T, then  for all t in R.
 Given a periodic point x then all points on the orbit  through x are periodic with the same prime period.

See also
 Limit cycle
 Limit set
 Stable set
 Sharkovsky's theorem
 Stationary point
 Periodic points of complex quadratic mappings

Limit sets